Dave Dictor (born December 4, 1956) is an American musician, singer of the punk rock band MDC (of which he is a founding member), and founder of the band's label, R Radical Records. Dictor is known for his political lyrics, involvement in the Rock Against Reagan campaign in the 1980s and being vegan.

Biography 
David Scott Dictor was raised in Long Island, New York and attended Boston University and the University of Texas in the 1970s. Dictor's father "Teddy" Dictor, was Jewish, while his mother was a Catholic from an Italian American family. His parents divorced when he was two years old, with Dictor raised by his mother, while his father moved to Florida.

In 1979, Dictor formed the Reejex, which morphed into a band called the Stains, with long-term musical partner Ron Posner. This later evolved into MDC in the fall of 1981. Dictor and MDC later relocated to San Francisco, California in 1982 and finally to Portland, Oregon in 1995. The band gave various projects different names with the MDC moniker, including Millions Of Dead Cops, Multi Death Corporation, Millions Of Dead Children, and Millions Of Damn Christians. In Portland, Dictor teamed up with Tom Roberts (Pig Champion) in 1997 and put out The Submissives' "An Anvil Will Wear Out Many A Hammer".

Dictor also appeared in the 2006 film American Hardcore, the film based upon the book of the same name. The song "I Remember"  also appears in the film and on the soundtrack.

Career 
Dave Dictor is the front man for the band MDC, a punk rock formed in 1979 in Austin, Texas. Among the first wave of bands to define the sound and style of American hardcore punk, MDC originally formed as The Stains and periodically changed the meaning of "MDC" - the most frequent being Millions of Dead Cops. The band's lyrical content expresses radical left political views and has proven influential within the punk subculture.

MDC released material through ex-Dead Kennedys singer Jello Biafra's independent label Alternative Tentacles. In the 1990s, vocalist Dave Dictor published editorials for the internationally distributed fanzine Maximumrocknroll. MDC's initial run ended in 1995, and the band spent five years on hiatus, before returning in 2000 with some new band members.

In 2016, MDC released a video for the forthcoming release of a new recording of "Born to Die", made to protest the Donald Trump presidential campaign. The song's slogan "No Trump, no KKK, no fascist USA" was reported to be heard at anti-Trump demonstrations in Chicago.  At the 2016 American Music Awards on November 20, the band Green Day adopted the anti-Trump slogan for a controversial impromptu chant during their live on-air performance, which Dictor applauded and encouraged. The media spotlight Green Day's action put on MDC inspired the band to create new material based around the current political climate. The album, entitled Mein Trumpf, was released in 2017.

Books 
In 2016, Dictor wrote his punk memoir MDC: Memoir from a Damaged Civilization: Stories of Punk, Fear, and Redemption, on his life rebelling against conformity, complacency, and conservatism through MDC.

References

External links
Official website
MySpace Official
YouTube Official
Flipside Interview - MDC interview from 1982
Goodreads - MDC: Memoir from a Damaged Civilization: Stories of Punk, Fear, and Redemption on Goodreads

1956 births
Living people
American male singers
American punk rock singers
American people of Jewish descent
American people of Italian descent
Anarcho-punk musicians
Jews in punk rock
Singers from New York (state)
People from Glen Cove, New York